The 2014–15 Ascenso MX season began July 18, 2014 and is divided into two tournaments named Apertura 2014 and Clausura 2015.  The Ascenso MX is the second-tier football league of Mexico.

Changes from the previous season

 U. de G. were promoted to Liga MX.
 Atlante F.C. were relegated from Liga MX.
 Zacatepec 1948 were relegated to Segunda División de México, but was able to purchase Cruz Azul Hidalgo's spot to remain in Ascenso MX and was rebranded Zacatepec Siglo XXI. Cruz Azul Hidalgo was dissolved.
 Coras F.C. was promoted from Segunda División de México.
 Estudiantes Tecos was moved to Zacatecas and rebranded to Mineros de Zacatecas by owner Grupo Pachuca.
 Ballenas Galeana was rebranded to Irapuato since they moved to Irapuato, Guanajuato.
 Delfines F.C. dissolved in May 2014.

Stadia and locations

The following 14 clubs will compete in the Ascenso MX during the 2014-2015 season:

Personnel and kits

Managerial changes

Torneo Apertura
The 2014 Apertura will be the first championship of the season. It began on July 18, 2014.

Standings

Results

Liguilla (Playoffs)

The six best teams after the first place play two games against each other on a home-and-away basis. The winner of each match up is determined by aggregate score. If the teams are tied, the Away goals rule applies.

The teams were seeded one to seven in quarterfinals, and will be re-seeded one to four in semifinals, depending on their position in the general table. The higher seeded teams play on their home field during the second leg.

 If the two teams are tied after both legs, the away goals rule applies. If both teams still tied, higher seeded team advances.
 Teams are re-seeded every round.
 The winner will qualify to the playoff match vs (Clausura 2015 Champions) . However, if the winner is the same in both tournaments, they would be the team promoted to the 2015–16 Mexican Primera División season without playing the Promotional Final

Quarterfinals

First leg

Second leg

Semifinals

First leg

Second leg

Final

First leg

Second leg

Torneo Clausura

Standings

Results

Liguilla (Playoffs)
The six best teams after the first place play two games against each other on a home-and-away basis. The winner of each match up is determined by aggregate score. If the teams are tied, the Away goals rule applies.

The teams were seeded one to seven in quarterfinals, and will be re-seeded one to four in semifinals, depending on their position in the general table. The higher seeded teams play on their home field during the second leg.

 If the two teams are tied after both legs, the away goals rule applies. If both teams still tied, higher seeded team advances.
 Teams are re-seeded every round.
 The winner will qualify to the playoff match vs (Necaxa). The winner will be promoted to the 2015–16 Mexican Primera División season

Quarterfinals

First leg

Second leg

Semifinals

First leg

Second leg

Final

First leg

Second leg

Promotional final

First Leg

Second leg

Aggregate table

Relegation table 
The relegated team would normally the team with the lowest ratio by summing the points scored in the following tournaments: Apertura 2012, Clausura 2013, Apertura 2013, Clausura 2014, Apertura 2014 and Clausura 2015. However, no team will be relegated to Second Division this season.

References

External links
Liga MX & Ascenso MX Official Website

2014-15